The 2019–20 Liga Nacional de Fútbol de Guatemala season is the 22nd season of the Liga Nacional de Guatemala, the top football league in Guatemala, in which the Apertura and Clausura season is used. The season will begin in July 2019 and will end in May 2020.

Team information 

A total of 12 teams will contest the league, including 10 sides from the 2017–18 Liga Nacional and 2 promoted from the 2017–18 Primera División.

Deportivo Petapa and Chiantla were relegated to 2018–19 Primera División the previous season.

The relegated team was replaced by the 2018–19 Primera División winners. F.C. Santa Lucía Cotzumalguapa and Deportivo Mixco.

Promotion and relegation 

Promoted from Primera División de Ascenso as of June 2019.

 Champions: F.C. Santa Lucía Cotzumalguapa and Mixco

Relegated to Primera División de Ascenso as of June 2019.

 Last Place: Petapa and Chiantla

Personnel and sponsoring

Managerial changes

Beginning of the season

During the Apertura season

Between Apertura and Clausura seasons

During the Clausura season

Apertura

League table

Results

Playoffs

Clausura

League table

Results

Playoffs

Aggregate table

List of foreign players in the league
This is a list of foreign players in 2019-2020 season. The following players:
have played at least one apertura game for the respective club.
have not been capped for the Guatemala national football team on any level, independently from the birthplace.  

A new rule was introduced a few season ago, that clubs can only have five foreign players per club and can only add a new player if there is an injury or player/s is released.

Antigua GFC
  Jose Mena
  Anllel Porras 
  Rafael Lezcano 
  Edgar Pacheco 
  Ricardo Álvarez Arce 

Coban Imperial
  Janderson Pereira
  Josue Flores 
  Victor Guay
  Jorge Luis Sotomayor 
  Lauro Ramón Cazal 
  Josue Mitchell Omier
  Gerson Mayen
  Derby Carrillo

CSD Comunicaciones  
  Michael Umaña
  José Calderón
  Maximiliano Lombardi 
  Darío Carreño 
  Cristian Alexis Hernández
  Agustin Herrera  
  Rafael Lezcano
  Bladimir Díaz 
  Jostin Daly

Guastatoya  
  Luis Landín
  Omar Dominguez 
  Daniel Guzman 
  Aaron Navarro 
  Jorge Ignacio Gatgens 
   Santos Crisanto 
  Adrián de Lemos
  Irvin Herrera

Deportivo Iztapa
  Sergio Blancas 
   Ramiro Rocca 
  Liborio Vicente Sánchez
  Kevin Santamaria 
  Byron Rodríguez 
   Carlos Felix

Deportivo Malacateco
  Daniel Cambronero  
  Andrey Francis  
  Claudio Inella  
  Enzo Herrera 
  Henry Hernandez 
  Luis Hurtado 

 (player released during the Apertura season)
 (player released between the Apertura and Clausura seasons)
 (player released during the Clausura season)

Mixco
  Dustin Corea
  Ronny Stuart Mora

CSD Municipal 
  Othoniel Arce 
  Orlando Moreira 
  Alejandro Diaz
   Ramiro Rocca
  Mekeil Andy Williams
  Nicolás Martínez Ramos

F.C. Santa Lucía Cotzumalguapa
  Rafael Da Roza
  Ángel Tejeda
  Diego Sanchez 
  Juan Leroyer
   Santos Crisanto 

Sanarate 
   Dario Silva
  Jorge Zaldivar
  Jonathan Posas
  William Zapata
  Juan Carlos Silva

Siquinalá
  Alvaro Portero Diez
  José Ortega
  You Ki Sun 
  Marlon Negrete
  Willinton Techera

Club Xelajú MC
   Carlos Felix  
  Juan Yax
  Darío Ferreira  
  Álvaro García  
  Gonzalo Vivanco  
  José Carlos Pérez 
  Jhonatan Souza Motta 
  Oscar Belinetz 
  David Rugamas

References

External links
 https://lared.com.gt/deportes/futbol/liga-nacional/
 https://www.guatevision.com/etiqueta/futbol-guatemala/

Liga Nacional de Fútbol de Guatemala seasons
1
Guatemala
Guatemala